The Hainan Museum is on Guoxing Avenue, Haikou, the capital city of Hainan Province, China. It was established in 1984, then moved to its permanent location in the Hainan Cultural Park at 68 Guoxing Avenue. There, it was officially reopened on November 15, 2008.

The facility is one of three large public works projects constructed around the same time on Guoxing Avenue alongside one another. The others are Hainan Library and Hainan Centre for the Performing Arts.

Since opening, it has received more than 800,000 visitors, including former leader Hu Jintao and Premier Li Keqiang.

Facility

The entire museum area covers 40,000 square metres. The first phase contains 18,000 square meters comprising the following:
 8,000-metre exhibition area
 Cultural relics storage
 Technical rooms
 Service facilities
 Small office buildings

The second phase of the project is in planning. It will have an area of 7,000 square meters and will contain the "Huaguangjiao One" shipwreck, where it will be restored and protected. It will house approximately 10,000 pieces of porcelain and other cultural relics and specimens pertaining to the history of the South China Sea, the maritime Silk Road, and items relating to geopolitics. It will also contain marine organisms and examples of mineral resources.

Collections
Presently, the museum has over 20,000 items including cultural relics and multimedia.

Exhibitions

Permanent
There are four basic permanent exhibitions:
 Collected Cultural Relics
 History of Hainan
 Minority Nationalities in Hainan
 Intangible Cultural Heritage in Hainan

Thematic
The museum has presented approximately 20 thematic exhibitions, including:
 Two Decades’ Development (exhibition on Hainan's Achievements in Building the Province and the Special Economic Zone in the Past Two Decades)
 Charm of Masters in Literature of the 20th Century
 Exhibition of Masterpieces of Asian Museum of Watercolor Art
 National Treasure Exhibition
 Exhibition of High and New Tech of Chinese Academy of Sciences and Tsinghua University

Visitor information
Hainan Museum is open from 09:00 to 17:00. It is closed on Mondays. Entrance is free with a maximum of 3,000 tickets issued daily, until 16:30. Identification is required to obtain a ticket. Professional narrators and self-service audio guides are available in Chinese, English, Japanese, Russian and other languages.

Partner museums
Hainan Museum is partnered with:
 National Museum of China
 Shanxi Museum
 Shandong Museum
 Nanjing Museum
 Hunan Museum

See also

 List of museums in China

References

External links
 Official website
 Images of objects on display

Museums established in 1984
Buildings and structures in Haikou
Art museums and galleries in China
Organizations based in Haikou
1984 establishments in China
Tourist attractions in Haikou
Museums in Hainan
National first-grade museums of China